Daniel Rosenthal may refer to:

 Daniel Rosenthal (politician), member of the New York State Assembly
 Dan K. Rosenthal (born 1966), Assistant to the President
 Daniel Rosenthal (criminal), American-French convict known for the murder of his mother